The Corbett Building was located at Southwest 5th and Morrison in downtown Portland, Oregon. Designed by Whidden & Lewis and built in 1907, the structure was demolished in 1988 to make way for the Pioneer Place shopping mall.

External links
 

1907 establishments in Oregon
1988 disestablishments in Oregon
Buildings and structures completed in 1907
Buildings and structures demolished in 1988
Former skyscrapers
Demolished buildings and structures in Portland, Oregon
Southwest Portland, Oregon